Christmas Steps may refer to:
Christmas Steps, Bristol, a road in Bristol, England
"Christmas Steps" (song), a song by Mogwai